Franz Portmann (born September 11, 1931) is a Canadian former cross-country skier who competed in the 1964 Winter Olympics. He was born in Escholzmatt.

References

1931 births
Living people
Canadian male cross-country skiers
Olympic cross-country skiers of Canada
Cross-country skiers at the 1964 Winter Olympics
Swiss emigrants to Canada